Guy Mercer (born 12 December 1989) is a former English rugby union player for Bath in the Aviva Premiership, who last played on loan to Welsh Pro14 side Ospreys. His position of choice was flanker.

Career

Bath
Mercer was promoted from the academy in the 2009–2010 season. He was named man-of-the-match in Bath's Aviva Premiership loss to Wasps in 2010 and was named club captain in 2016.

Ospreys
In August 2017, Mercer joined Welsh Pro14 side Ospreys on a season-long loan deal, joining in time for the opening round of the 2017–18 Pro14 season.

References

External links
Bath Profile
Premiership Rugby Profile

1989 births
Living people
People educated at King Edward's School, Bath
Rugby union players from Bristol
English rugby union players
Rugby union flankers
Bath Rugby players
Ospreys (rugby union) players